Suryapura may refer to:

Suryapura, Nawalparasi, Nepal
Suryapura, Rupandehi, Nepal